The NBA G League Defensive Player of the Year is an annual NBA G League award given since the league's inaugural season to the best defensive player of the regular season. The league's head coaches determine the award by voting and it is usually presented to the honoree during the D-League playoffs.

Through the 2020–21 season, three players have been named the Defensive Player of the Year more than once: Derrick Zimmerman (2005, 2006), Stefhon Hannah (2012, 2013) and DeAndre Liggins (2014, 2016). Six international players have been named recipients: Stéphane Lasme (Gabon), Mouhamed Sene (Senegal), Walter Tavares (Cape Verde), Landry Nnoko (Cameroon), Chris Boucher (Canada), and Christ Koumadje (Chad). Jeff Myers was the inaugural winner while playing for the Greenville Groove.

Winners

See also
NBA Defensive Player of the Year Award

References

External links
D-League Defensive Player of the Year Award Winners at basketball-reference.com

National Basketball Association lists
Defensive Player
Awards established in 2002
2002 establishments in the United States